During the Russian invasion of Ukraine, Russia has forcibly transferred thousands of Ukrainian children to areas under its control, assigned them Russian citizenship, forcibly adopted them into Russian families, and created obstacles for their reunification with their parents and homeland.  The United Nations has stated that these deportations constitute war crimes. The International Criminal Court has issued arrest warrants for President Vladimir Putin (who has explicitly supported the forced adoptions, including by enacting legislation to facilitate them) and Children's Rights Commissioner Maria Lvova-Belova for their alleged involvement. According to international law, including the 1948 Genocide Convention, such acts constitute genocide if done with intent to destroy, in whole or in part, a nation or ethnic group.

Ukrainian children have been abducted by the Russian state after their parents had been arrested by Russian occupation authorities or killed in the invasion, or after becoming separated from their parents in an active war zone. Children have also been abducted from Ukrainian state institutions in occupied areas, and through children's "summer camps" on Russian territory. The abducted children have been subject to Russification; raising children of war in a foreign nation and culture may constitute an act of genocide if intended to erase their national identity.

Estimates of the number of children involved range from 13,000 to over 300,000. The Office of the Ukrainian Prosecutor General said in December 2022 that nearly 800 had died or disappeared during the process of deportation.

Overview

Abductions 
The vast majority of the abducted children have been abducted from southern and eastern Ukraine (Kherson, Kharkiv, Zaporizhzhia, Donetsk, Luhansk and Mykolaiv regions).

Parental separation 
Some children have been abducted after becoming separated from their parents while fleeing active war zones, and some have been abducted after their parents were detained in filtration camps.

State institutions 
Children have been abducted from Ukrainian state-run institutions such as orphanages, group homes, care homes, hospitals, and boarding schools; many of the forcibly transferred children were taken from orphanages and group homes. Most children in the care of Ukrainian state institutions are not orphans but were only temporarily or permanently placed under the care of the state by parents facing personal hardships such as poverty, illness, or addiction. The Ukrainian state facilitates the voluntary temporary or permanent placement of children under the care of state institutions by parents. Some 90% of Ukrainian children living under state care were thus "social orphans" – children with family members who are for various reasons unable to care for them. The United Nations estimated that some 90,000 children resided in state-run homes in Ukraine prior to the 2022 invasion. Regardless of whether the children had living parents or were indeed wards of the state, such forced transfers during wartime likely constitute a war crime.

Summer camp stays 
Parents in Russian-occupied areas have been encouraged by Russian occupation authorities to send their children to so-called "summer camps" (in fact re-education camps for Ukrainian children) for a respite from the Russo-Ukrainian War. Some parents were pressured to allow their children to go to the camps, while others, according to Ukraine's ombudswoman for abducted children, acquiesced in order to get their children out of a war zone.

Some of these children have been subsequently detained in the camps indefinitely, while others were returned weeks or months later than promised. Some parents who sent their children to the "summer camps" were subsequently told that their children would be returned only if their parents pick them up in person, but travel between Ukraine and Russia is difficult and expensive, some camps are located far from Ukraine (including as far as Magadan Oblast in the Russian Far East, which abuts the Pacific coast), and many children are from low-income families that cannot afford the journey (some had to sell their belongings to afford the journey and travel through four countries to collect their children from the camps); even relatives granted power of attorney by parents are not allowed to collect the children, and all men (including parents) of ages between 18 and 60 are forbidden from leaving Ukraine as they are eligible for conscription, so that in practice, in most cases only the mothers are able to retrieve the children. In some instances, camp officials said that the return of children was dependent upon Russia recapturing Ukrainian territory, and one child was told that he would not be returned home due to his "pro-Ukrainian views".

Allegations of maltreatment 
According to witness testimonies obtained by the United Nations Commission of Inquiry on Ukraine, some of the children have experienced poor living conditions, inadequate care, and verbal abuse while living under the custody of the Russian state.  The Ukrainian government has claimed that some children have experienced sexual exploitation after being forcibly transferred to Russia.

Russian policies

Adoptions 
Russian law prohibits adoptions of children from third countries by Russian citizens without the consent of the child's home country. In May 2022 when Vladimir Putin signed a decree facilitating the adoption and granting of Russian citizenship to Ukrainian children - the change represents a legal obstacle to future reunification of the abducted children with their Ukrainian families.

The Russian government has created a register of Russian families that may adopt Ukrainian children, and a hotline for Russian families seeking to adopt Ukrainian children from Donbas. Adoptive families receive a cash payment for each adopted Ukrainian child that is granted Russian citizenship.

Russification 
According to The New York Times, "Russian officials have made clear that their goal is to replace any childhood attachment to home with a love for Russia". Upon arriving in Russia, the children are placed in homes and subjected to re-education.

Re-education camps 

In 2022, the Russian government established a large-scale system of at least 43 children's camps in Russia and Russia-occupied Crimea the main purpose of which appears to be "integrating children from Ukraine into the Russian government's vision of national culture, history, and society", according to a report by Yale School of Public Health’s Humanitarian Research Lab. Children in such camps have been subjected to Russification, Russian state propaganda, and military education (including firearm training). Parents in Russian-occupied areas are encouraged or coerced to send their children to these so-called "summer camps" for a respite from the war, with the children subsequently sometimes not returned to the parents as promised. Orphans, children from Ukrainian state institutions, and children who have become separated from their legal guardians due to the conflict have also been sent to these camps. At least 6,000 Ukrainian children have attended such camps; analysis of information from public accounts and satellite imagery has indicated the number of children housed in such camps to be far higher. According to the United States State Department spokesman, children in the camps have in many cases been cut off from all contact with their families.

Propaganda 
The domestic narrative of the Russian state is that abandoned children are rescued from the ravages of war by the magnanimous Russian state. The forced transfer of Ukrainian children forms part of a broader propaganda strategy by Vladimir Putin attempting to portray Ukraine as part of the Russian nation, justify the invasion, and bolster support for the war. The Russian state has carefully crafted the portrayal of the forced transfers of children to the Russian public. Russian state television has broadcast footage of Russian officials handing out teddy bears to newly arrived abducted children, and Russian officials in Donetsk have invited reporters to events where gifts were handed out to abducted children.

Preventing repatriation and family reunification 
Many parents wish to reunite with their children (some do not, either due to financial reasons or previous estrangement). Russian authorities do not make any attempt to contact parents to notify them that their children are in the custody of the Russian state. Likewise, they do not release any information regarding the identities of the transferred children, making it difficult for Ukrainian and international authorities to locate and identify the children. Even in cases where parents have successfully tracked down their children and formally applied to the Russian authorities to be reunited with them, Russian officials have attempted to pressure or persuade the parents and children to consent to transfer, promising creature comforts and a better life. In cases where parents (or other legal guardian) and children are unable to establish contact or parents are unable or unwilling to personally come collect the children, children are deported to Russia even if they personally express a desire to remain in Ukraine. Abducted children have been lied to by Russian officials about their parents having abandoned them.

History

Russia started transferring children from Ukrainian territories as early as 2014, the first year of the Russo-Ukrainian War.

The first reports of forced deportations to Russia as part of the 2022 Russian invasion of Ukraine came mid-March 2022, during the siege of Mariupol. The same month, Russian children's rights commissioner Maria Lvova-Belova has stated that a group of Ukrainian children transferred to Russia from Mariupol had initially asserted their Ukrainian identity, but that it had since transformed into a love for Russia, saying that she had adopted one of the children herself.

On 22 March 2022, Ukraine and U.S. authorities claimed more than 2,300 children had been kidnapped by Russian forces from the Donetsk and Luhansk Oblasts.

On 30 May 2022, Vladimir Putin signed a decree that streamlined the process of adopting Ukrainian orphans or those without parental care and giving them Russian citizenship.

According to a May 2022 report by the Raoul Wallenberg Centre for Human Rights in Montreal and the New Lines Institute in Washington, there are "reasonable grounds to conclude" that Russia is in breach of two articles of the 1948 Genocide Convention, among them the forcible transfer of Ukrainian children to Russia, in itself a genocidal act.

By 11 April, two-thirds of Ukraine's 7.5 million children had been displaced according to the U.N. Ukraine's human rights commissioner, Lyudmila Denysova, and U.N. ambassador Sergiy Kyslytsya, stated at that time that more than 120,000 children had been deported to Russia. By 26 May, more than 238,000 Ukrainian children were reported to have been deported to Russian territory.

Ukraine raised the issue at a meeting of the Organization for Security and Co-operation in Europe (OSCE) in early June, where the head of Ukraine's mission, Yevhenii Tsymbaliuk, quoted a message from a Ukrainian child who had been forcibly adopted despite having close living relations; addressed to his aunt, it read, in part, "They say I'm an orphan. But I'm not an orphan, I have you, I have grandparents. There are so many children like me here. They say they want to leave us in Russia. And I don't want to stay in Russia!"

According to Ukrainska Pravda, Russia has taken 267 orphans from Mariupol to Rostov to be made Russian citizens, supervised by Maria Lvova-Belova. It also reported that Russian authorities had looked for and collected orphaned children, to be taken to an unknown destination.

Sky News released CCTV footage dated June 2022 of Russian FSB officials entering an orphanage Kherson to search for orphans. Aware of the risk of child abductions, the staff hid the children prior to their arrival. Finding the orphanage empty, the FSB agents seized records, computers, and the CCTV system from the orphanage in an apparent effort to track down the missing children. Russian authorities subsequently sent abducted 15 children to be housed in the orphanage, only to be taken away by the Russian occupiers as they retreated from Kherson. Russian forces also successfully abducted children from a different Kherson orphanage, an eyewitness told Sky News.

In June 2022, Mikhail Mizintsev, head of the National Defense Management Center, claimed 1,936,911 Ukrainians had been deported to Russia, of whom 307,423 were children.

On 7 September a United Nations official reported that there were credible accusations that Russian forces had sent Ukrainian children to Russia for adoption as part of a forced deportation programme, and the US ambassador informed the UN Security Council that more than 1,800 Ukrainian children had been transferred to Russia in July alone.

Child abduction during "filtration" procedures was documented in a 10 November 2022 Amnesty International report entitled "Russia’s Unlawful Transfer And Abuse Of Civilians In Ukraine During 'Filtration'". An 11-year-old boy testified to Amnesty International:

Reactions

Ukraine
Ukrainian authorities have claimed Putin's decree to be a way to "legalize the abduction of children from the territory of Ukraine". They have maintained this "grossly violate[s]" the 1949 Geneva Convention Relative to the Protection of Civilian Persons in Time of War, and the 1989 UN Convention on the Rights of the Child.

The Foreign Ministry of Ukraine also believes that the actions may qualify as a forcible transfer of children from one human group to another. In a statement: "The most serious international crimes against children committed by Russian high-ranking officials and servicemen in Ukraine will be investigated, and the perpetrators will be prosecuted. Russia will not be able to avoid the strictest accountability."

United Nations
UNICEF Emergency Programs Director Manuel Fontaine told CBS News that UNICEF "are looking into how we can track or help on that", though stating they do not have ability to investigate at the moment.

Michelle Bachelet, the United Nations High Commissioner for Human Rights, announced on 15 June 2022 that her agency had started an investigation into allegations of children forcibly deported from Ukraine to the Russian Federation.

On 15 March 2023, the Office of the United Nations High Commissioner for Human Rights (OHCHR) released a report declaring these forced transfers of children are illegal and a war crime. It broadly gave three categories of deported children: those who lost contact with their parents due to the Russian invasion, those who were separated when their parents were sent to a Russian filtration camp, and those who were in institutions. The report concluded:

Civil society
On 21 December 2022, a French NGO, "For Ukraine, for their Freedom and Ours!", submitted via the law firm Vigo a communication to Karim Khan, Chief Prosecutor for the International Criminal Court, to contribute to "the investigation opened on 2 March 2022 by the Office of the Prosecutor, upon referral of the situation in Ukraine by a coordinated group of States Parties to the Rome Statute". The communication "relates to the forcible transfer and large-scale deportation of Ukrainian children to Russia, in a clear attempt by the Russian authorities to erase, at least in part, Ukrainians as a national group with a distinct identity. These facts are likely to constitute several of the crimes listed in Article 5 of the Rome Statute, and more specifically the crime of genocide (Article 6-e) and crimes against humanity (Article 7-d)".

Genocide scholar Timothy D. Snyder tweeted: "Kidnapping children en masse and seeking to assimilate them in a foreign culture is genocide according to Article 2 Section E of the 1948 genocide convention."

Sanctions
Russian children's rights commissioner Maria Lvova-Belova has been sanctioned by the United States, the European Union, the United Kingdom, Canada and Australia.

Arrest warrants

On 17 March 2023, the International Criminal Court issued arrest warrants for Putin and Lvova-Belova, alleging criminal responsibility for the unlawful deportation and transfer of population (children) from occupied areas of Ukraine to Russia. It decided that they are covered by articles 8(2)(a)(vii) and article 8(2)(b)(viii) of the Rome Statute and intended by Russia as permanent. The charges carry a potential life sentence. It is the first time the court has issued an arrest warrant against the leader of a permanent member of the United Nations Security Council. ICC Prosecutor Karim Khan said, "We must ensure that those responsible for alleged crimes are held accountable and that children are returned to their families and communities. We cannot allow children to be treated as if they are the spoils of war."

See also

Notes

References

External links
 
 

Adoption, fostering, orphan care and displacement
Anti-Ukrainian sentiment in Russia
Child abduction in Russia
Child refugees
Child welfare in Russia
Childhood in Ukraine
Cultural genocide
Displacement of indigenous children
Forced migrations in Europe
International adoption
International child abduction
Kidnapped children
Kidnappings in Ukraine
Mass kidnappings of the 2020s
Refugees in Russia
Russian adoptees
Russification
Ukrainian children
Ukrainian diaspora in Russia
Ukrainian refugees
Vladimir Putin
War crimes during the 2022 Russian invasion of Ukraine